Lick Creek may refer to:

Streams

Illinois
Lick Creek (Sangamon River), in Illinois

Missouri
Lick Creek (Fishing River), in Missouri
Lick Creek (Meramec River), in Missouri
Lick Creek (North Fork Cuivre River), in Missouri
Lick Creek (North Fork River), in Missouri
Lick Creek (Osage River), in Missouri
Lick Creek (Smith Creek), in Missouri
Lick Creek (St. Francis River), in Missouri

North Carolina
Lick Creek (Brown Creek tributary), a stream in Anson County, North Carolina
Lick Creek (Cape Fear River tributary), a stream in Lee County, North Carolina
Lick Creek (Deep River tributary), a stream in Moore County, North Carolina

Pennsylvania
Lick Creek (Shamokin Creek), in Pennsylvania

Tennessee
Lick Creek (Duck River), in Tennessee
Lick Creek (Henderson County, Tennessee), in Tennessee

Populated places
Lick Creek, Kentucky
Lick Creek, West Virginia
Lick Creek Township, Davis County, Iowa